In for the Kill may refer to:

 In for the Kill!, a 1974 album by Budgie
 In for the Kill (Kevin DuBrow album), 2004
 "In for the Kill" (song), a 2009 song by La Roux
 In for the Kill, a 1995 album by The Independents
 "In for the Kill", a song by Black Sabbath from Seventh Star
 "In for the Kill", a song by Winger from Pull
 "In for the Kill", a song by Grailknights from Alliance
 "In for the Kill", a song by Electric Light Orchestra
 "In for the Kill", a song by Pro-Pain from Act of God
 "In for the Kill", a band featuring Bill Gaal of Nothingface